Gloria June Tew (May 10, 1923 – January 31, 2022) was an American abstract sculptor known for her work in marble, bronze and steel. Tew's sculptures are found in institutions, museums, churches and private collections including, King Carl XVI Gustaf and Queen Silvia of Sweden. She resided in Minneapolis.

Early life and education
Tew was born in Duluth, Minnesota, on May 10, 1923. She attended Minneapolis College of Art and Design where she studied with Alice Tweton. As an adult, Tew went back to Gustavus Adolphus College in St. Peter, Minnesota, where she was encouraged by her teacher Paul Granlund (1925–2003) to pursue sculpting. Tew attributes most of her influences to the late Architect Ralph Rapson (1914–2008), who also designed the artist's home and was often found in Tew's studio and the late Modernist Charles Biederman (1906–2004).

Career
Tew began her career as a freelance fashion illustrator in Minneapolis at the age of 15. The drastic change in her artistic direction was brought on by the death of her only child in 1969. Shortly after the tragedy, a friend introduced Tew to Sculptor Paul Granlund, who was the resident sculptor at Gustavus at that time and ultimately became Tews's mentor and friend.

Personal life and death
Tew died in Crystal, Minnesota, on January 31, 2022, at the age of 98.

Honors
President's National League of Cities Award. Washington, D.C. 2003
Governor Rudy Perpich Memorial—15 foot monument sculpture, Lake Wood Cemetery, Minneapolis  1996
"Caring" Competition Winner. Duluth, Minnesota and Växjö, Sweden August 1993
 An eight-foot bronze sculpture was placed in the town square of Växjö, Sweden as a part of a sister competition in Duluth, Minnesota 1993.
"Caring" a Cararra marble sculpture, April, 1988
 Selected for presentation to Sweden's King Carl XVI Gustaf and Queen Silvia during the Royal Visit to Minneapolis, as part of New Sweden '88 Minneapolis, Minnesota April 1988.
"Trees" stainless steel sculpture 1980.
 Finalist in the University of Minnesota's 75th Anniversary Alumni Sculpture Competition 1980
Women of Achievement Award West Suburban Chamber of Commerce nominee for Minneapolis, Minnesota 1980
"Reflections" a 15-foot outdoor stainless steel sculptor. 1987.
Winner of Sculpture Competition for the Minnetonka Civic Center, Minnetonka, Minnesota 1987
"Roll of Honor", stainless steel sculpture 1986
Finalist in Veterans Administration Medical Center Competition, Minneapolis, Minnesota 1986

Exhibitions
American Swedish institute, Monuments and Celebrations, the work of Gloria Tew, a retrospective.  2005
"Caring Hands", selected for Generose Building, St. Mary's Hospital (Mayo), Rochester, Minnesota
International Care Givers Conference, Mayo Clinic, Rochester, Minnesota 1996
Granlund Influence Invitational 1985 Callaway Galleries 1984
Lutheran Brotherhood Invitational 1983
United Methodist Invitational 1982
The American Swedish institute 1981
Governor's Mansion 1981
Gustavus Adolphus College 1973

Public collections
University of Minnesota School of Nursing, Minneapolis, Minnesota 2009.
Gustavus Adolphus, St. Peter, Minnesota 2006 
Ridgeway International, Hopkins, Minnesota 2006 
Rochester Rowing Club, Rochester, Minnesota 2004.
Mayo Clinic, Gonda Building, Rochester, Minnesota 2005.
Delta Dental, Breast Cancer Race, Claremorris, Ireland 2001.
Mount Olivet Lutheran Church Retreat Center installation, Minneapolis, Minnesota 2001.
Basilica of St. Mary, Minneapolis, Minnesota 2000.
St. John the Baptist Catholic Church, New Brighton, Minnesota 2000.
Camp Heartland for Children with AIDS, Willow River, Minnesota 1999.
Wayzata Community Church, Wayzata, Minnesota 1998.
Archdiocese, St. Paul, Minnesota 1998.
Hamline University, St. Paul, Minnesota 1997.
Governor's Monument, St. Paul, Minnesota 1996.
Lakewood Cemetery, Minneapolis, Minnesota date unknown.
Courage Center, Stillwater, Minnesota 1996.
University of St. Thomas chapel, St. Paul, Minnesota 1996.
Minnehaha Communion Lutheran Church, Minneapolis, Minnesota 1994.
Saint Mary's Hospital-Mayo Clinic, Rochester, Minnesota 1994.
Pentair International, St. Paul, Minnesota 1994.
Town Square, Växjö, Kronoberg, Sweden 1993.
Dale Carnegie Office Building, Minneapolis, Minnesota 1991.
Odaka Building, Tokyo, Japan 1990.
Unisys Corporation, Minneapolis, Minnesota 1990.
Hagan Systems, Eden Prairie, Minnesota 1990.
Grigsby Gallery, Atlanta, Georgia 1989.
Tucson Museum of Art, Tucson, Arizona 1988
Minnetonka Civic Center, Minnetonka, Minnesota 1987.
Burnet Realty, Minneapolis, Minnesota 1985.
Kraus-Anderson Companies, Minneapolis, Minnesota (Date not given).
Trammell Crow Company, Minneapolis, Minnesota (Date not given).
M.S.P.E. Office Building, St. Paul, Minnesota  1978.
Marquette National Bank, Minneapolis, Minnesota 1975.
IDS Center Health One, Minneapolis, Minnesota 1975.

References

Sources 
 Mayo Clinic's 31st International Association for Human Caring Conference Guest Speaker, Date: June 5, 2010.
http://www.HumanCaring.org/pdf/IAHC%20conference%20brochure%202010.pdf
 Nursing, The Finest Art, 3rd Edition, Donahue, Patricia M. PhD, RN, FAAN, Year: 2010
 Unveiling Tew sculpture in honor of 100th anniversary of the U of M School of Nursing. Article in Minnesota School of Nursing Magazine, Date: Spring/Summer 2010 edition
 Design Directions, Minnesota Magazine, Date: March 2001
 KMSP TV, The Buzz segment, Robinson, Robynne. Date: July 1998
 KSTP TV News, coverage of "Rudy and Lola" sculpture, Miles, Pat. Date: September 21, 1996
 Lakeshore Weekly "Sculptor Uses Her Art to Encourage People", Date: May 1996
 KARE 11 TV News Special Feature "Accidental Artist", Constantine, Alan and Pierce. Date: October 7, 1996
 Feature article in the Minneapolis Star Tribune, Column, "Art May Be in the Eye of the Beholders", author Grow, Doug. Date: September 24, 1994
 Feature article in Minneapolis/St. Paul Magazine, Date: September 1993
 TV Accent on Art, TV Interview, Matteson, Chris. Year: 1991
 Cover, photographs, and feature article in Active Lifestyle, "Gloria Tew and Her Works" Paragon Cable TV Production, Minneapolis, Date: August 1991
 Cable Television Program. "A Conversation with Gloria Tew", Year: 1983.
 Feature article in Twin Cities Magazine, Date: November 1981
 "Gloria Tew" Minnesota Monthly, Article Date: February 1, 2001

External links
 Minnesota State Arts Board Artist Registry
 Gloria Tew's website

1923 births
2022 deaths
20th-century American sculptors
21st-century American sculptors
Artists from Minneapolis
People from Duluth, Minnesota
Sculptors from Minnesota
Gustavus Adolphus College alumni
Minneapolis College of Art and Design alumni